Fermitin family homolog 2 (FERMT2) also known as pleckstrin homology domain-containing family C member 1 (PLEKHC1) or kindlin-2 is a protein that in humans is encoded by the FERMT2 gene.

Kindlin-2 is the first of the kindlin protein to be discovered in 1994. It was detected in a screen for epidermal growth factor (EGF)-induced mRNAs and initially named mitogen-inducible gene 2 (Mig-2) protein.

Function 

FERMT2 is a component of extracellular matrix structures in mammalian cells and is required for proper control of cell shape change.

A major task of kindlins is to regulate the activation of integrins.

Interactions 

FERMT2 has been shown to interact with FBLIM1.

Role in health and diseases
 Loss of kindlin-2 in mice leads to peri-implantation lethality.
 Kindlin-2 is highly expressed in activated myofibroblasts for regulation of focal adhesion formation.
Deletion of Kindlin-2 retards insulin secretion and reduces β-cell mass in mice.
 Elevated kindlin-2 expression was observed in tubular intestinal fibrosis of the kidney, a condition is characterized by massive expansion of the cortical interstitium, conversion of fibroblasts into myofibroblasts and progressive EMT of tubular epithelial cells.
 Kindlin-2 is required for angiogenesis and blood vessel homeostasis.
  Kindlin-2 can exert tumor-promoting or tumor-inhibiting functions based on tumor-type-dependent.
  FERMT2 modulates the Alzheimer's Disease risk by regulating APP metabolism and Aβ peptide production.

References

Further reading 

 
 
 </ref>

External links 
 FERMT2 Info with links in the Cell Migration Gateway